The men's snooker singles tournament at the 2006 Asian Games in Doha took place from 6 December to 7 December at Al-Sadd Multi-Purpose Hall.

Ding Junhui won the competition by beating Liang Wenbo 4–2 in the final.

Schedule
All times are Arabia Standard Time (UTC+03:00)

Results
Legend
WO — Won by walkover

Finals

Top half

Section 1

Section 2

Bottom half

Section 3

Section 4

References 

Results
Draw

External links 
 Official Website

Cue sports at the 2006 Asian Games